The Hidden Lake Formation is a Late Cretaceous geologic formation in Antarctica. The sandstones and siltstones of the formation were deposited in a deltaic environment.

Indeterminate megalosaur remains have been recovered from it. Also many plant fossils and ichnofossils of Planolites sp. and Palaeophycus sp. have been found in the formation.

Paleofauna
Megalosauroidea indet.
Palaeophycus sp.
Planolites sp.

Flora 

 Antarctoxylon mixai
 Dicotylophyllum
 Elatocladus cf. heterophylla
 Lygodium sp.
 Microphyllopteris sp.

See also 
 List of dinosaur-bearing rock formations
 List of stratigraphic units with indeterminate dinosaur fossils
 List of fossiliferous stratigraphic units in Antarctica
 Snow Hill Island Formation

References

Further reading 
 V. D. Barreda, S. Palamarczuk, and F. Medina. 1999. Palinología de la Formación Hidden Lake (Coniaciano-Santoniano), Isla James Ross, Antártida. Revista Española de Micropaleontología (31)53-72
 R. E. Molnar, A. L. Angriman, and Z. Gasparini. 1996. An Antarctic Cretaceous theropod. Memoirs of the Queensland Museum 39(3):669-674
 D. Néraudeau, A. Crame, and M. Kooser. 2000. Upper Cretaceous echinoids from James Ross Basin, Antarctica. Géobios 33(4):455-466

Geologic formations of Antarctica
Cretaceous System of Antarctica
Coniacian Stage
Sandstone formations
Deltaic deposits
Paleontology in Antarctica
James Ross Island